The Community Methodist Church of Ione, is a United Methodist church in Ione, California, United States. The church is registered as a California Historical Landmark and is listed on the National Register of Historic Places.

History

The church was founded in 1861 with $8,000 being set aside for its building. Construction started on July 4, 1862.  When the church was dedicated in 1866, it was called the "Ione City Centenary Church." Eventually it was called "Cathedral of the Mother Lode."

Architecture

The church is made of brick. It consists of 255,000 bricks which were locally fired. It has a high roof with rafters that are visible. The roof and rafters do not use any bolts.

References

Churches in Amador County, California
California Historical Landmarks
Churches on the National Register of Historic Places in California
United Methodist churches in California
Gothic Revival church buildings in California
Churches completed in 1862
19th-century Methodist church buildings in the United States
National Register of Historic Places in Amador County, California
1861 establishments in California